Roberto Tomás Morales Ojeda (born 15 June 1967) is a Cuban physician and politician who currently serves as a Vice President of Cuba. He is a member of the Politburo of the Communist Party of Cuba (PCC) and, between 2010 and 2018, served in the Council of Ministers as Minister of Public Health.

Early life 
Born in the province of Cienfuegos, Morales Ojeda completed a degree in medicine in 1991, with a specialization in comprehensive and general medicine. He later completed a master's degree in public health.

He was elected to the National Assembly of People's Power in 2008. In 2014, he served as President of the sixty-seventh session of the WHO's World Health Assembly. On 19 April 2018, he was elected one of the six Vice-Presidents of Cuba. The National Assembly officially approved his, as well as other Cabinet nominations, in a vote of confidence on 21 July 2018.

References 

1967 births
Living people
Cuban physicians
Government ministers of Cuba
Communist Party of Cuba politicians
People from Cienfuegos Province